This is a list of notable footballers who have played for Crewe Alexandra F.C. Generally, this means players that have played 100 or more first-class matches for the club. However, some players who have played fewer matches are also included; players who fell just short of the 100 total but made significant contributions to the club's history.

For a list of all Crewe Alexandra players, major or minor, with a Wikipedia article, see Category:Crewe Alexandra F.C. players. For player appearance records see List of Crewe Alexandra F.C. records and statistics and for the current squad see the main Crewe Alexandra F.C. article.

List of players
(Current Crewe players shown in bold, totals as of 18 March 2023)

References

Books

Internet

Players
 
Crewe Alexandra
Association football player non-biographical articles